Mehdi Eslami (born January 8, 1992, in Sari) is an Iranian football defender, who currently plays for Esteghlal Ahvaz.

Club performance 
He started playing football for the youngsters of Rah-e-Ahan and joined Saipa in the youth category and Saipa football club in the youth category. Doing military service he joined the Fajr team in Tehran and then joined the hopes of Esteghlal.

Esteghlal Tehran 
After attending Fajr Football Club and leaving behind military service, he joined Esteghlal Tehran Football Club with a contract and won the Iranian League with the same year with Esteghlal Tehran.

Bandar Abbas Municipality 
After winning the championship with Esteghlal Tehran and with the opinion of Amir Ghalehvani, he joined the Bandar Abbas Municipality Football Club on loan.

Independence of Ahwaz 
After Esteghlal Tehran and Bandar Abbas Municipality, he joined the Esteghlal Ahvaz football team and played for this team for four seasons.

National team 
He has a history of playing in the national youth football team of Iran and the national youth football team of Iran in his record

Honors 
Premier League championship with Esteghlal Tehran in the twelfth league 2012-2013

Club career

Club career statistics

References

Iranian footballers
1992 births
Living people
PAS Hamedan F.C. players
Shahrdari Bandar Abbas players
Esteghlal F.C. players
Machine Sazi F.C. players
Association football defenders